Jeong Ju-hyeon (born October 13, 1990), is a center fielder and second baseman for the LG Twins. He began his career when he was recruited as a left fielder for the LG Twins in 2009 and stayed with the team until 2013.

Education 
 Daehyun Elementary School, Ulsan
 Gyeongsang Middle School, Daegu
 Daegu High School, Daegu

External links 
 Sangmu Baseball Team home page

See also

References 

1990 births
Living people
South Korean baseball players
Korea Armed Forces Athletic Corps
Sportspeople from Ulsan